The Tug Fork River Band was a Southern groove metal band from Indianapolis, Indiana. The group formed in 2006, but disbanded in 2013.

History
The band began in 2006 with the lineup of Vocalist Aaron Quinn, Guitarist Justin Foxworth, Bassist Brian Dukes, and Drummer David Leap. In 2007, the band released their debut EP independently, titled The Dirty Dirty. In May 2009, the band released their debut album through Wounded Records, titled Catch for Us the Metal. The band was originally supposed to be a part of Dimebag Darrell (Pantera, Damageplan)'s tribute album. In 2011, Leap departed from the band and was replaced by Derek Schweilbold. In 2012, the band released Vulture independently. The EP was originally jokingly titled POOP-EP. Foxworth drew the album cover and the album was then titled Vulture. The band released a lyric video for "Ex Wives" off the EP, which was highly acclaimed. To support the EP, the band went on a mini-tour with Becoming the Archetype. In 2013, the band released their final EP, No Hope For Man, their best known material. In 2017, the band re-released their debut EP, The Dirty Dirty due to recent requests from their fans.

Members
Last Known Lineup
 Aaron Quinn - Vocals (2006-2013)
 Justin Foxworth - Guitars (2006-2013)
 Brian Dukes - Bass, Backing Vocals (2006-2013)
 Derek Schweilbold - Drums (2011-2013)

Former
 David Leap - Drums (2006-2011)

Discography
Studio albums
 Catch for Us the Metal (2009; Wounded)

EPs
 The Dirty Dirty (2007)
 Vulture (2012)
 No Hope for Man (2013)
 The Dirty Dirty (2017; Re-released)

References

External links
Twitter

American Christian metal musical groups
Musical groups established in 2006
Musical groups disestablished in 2013
Musical groups from Indianapolis
American groove metal musical groups
American southern rock musical groups
Heavy metal musical groups from Indiana